KEUN (1490 AM) is a radio station licensed to Eunice, Louisiana, United States, broadcasting a news/talk/information format. The station is currently owned by Dane Wilson, through licensee Cajun Prairie Broadcasting, LLC.

References

External links

Radio stations in Louisiana
News and talk radio stations in the United States